510 East York Street is a home in Savannah, Georgia, United States, located in the southwestern trust lot of Greene Square. It was built around 1799, as a property of U.S. senator George Jones, making it one of the three remaining buildings original to the square and one of the few remaining 18th-century buildings in the city. It is part of the Savannah Historic District.

In 1851, it was owned by Mary E. Coe. 

A survey for Historic Savannah Foundation, undertaken Mary Lane Morrison, found the building to be of significant status.

See also
Buildings in Savannah Historic District

References

Houses in Savannah, Georgia
Houses completed in 1799
Greene Square (Savannah) buildings
Savannah Historic District